The Malang Regency is a regency in East Java, Indonesia. Malang Regency is the second largest regency in East Java after Banyuwangi Regency, with a total area of 3,530.65 km2. Malang is rich in potential for agriculture, medicinal plants and tourism.

It had a population of 2,446,218 people at the 2010 census and 2,654,448 at the 2020 Census. These figures did not include the areas and populations of the two autonomous cities of Malang and Batu which lie within the regency, but are administratively independent. The capital of the regency is the town of Kepanjen.

Most of the population resides in the Greater Malang (Malang Raya) area, a metropolitan area that includes the cities of Malang and Batu and 15 other districts within the regency in a valley between the two cities. The distance between Malang and Batu is approximately 20 km. This metropolitan area covers 1,200.43 km2; it has a population of 2,325,109 (2010 census), with a density of 1,936.9/km2 (5,016/sq mile).

History 

Historical and archaeological records from Hindu temples suggest that the Kanjuruhan Kingdom emerged in the region during the 8th and 9th centuries. An inscription on the Dinoyo shrine at Badhut places the shrine's inauguration on Friday, Legi 1st, Margasirsa 682 Saka in the Javanese calendar or November 28, 760 AD.

At one time, the Kanjuruhan kingdom was under the leadership of Akuwu Singhasari Ametung, who was married to Ken Dedes. At that time the Kingdom was under the rule of the Kingdom of Kediri, and the Singhasari Government Center was in Tumapel. Only after Ken Arok killed Akuwu Ametung and married Ken Dedes did the centre of control move to the Malang Kingdom, and this only after defeating the Kingdom of Kediri. Kediri at that time fell into the hands of Singhasari.

During its peak, the Mataram Kingdom fell into the hands of Mataram, as well as the Kingdom of Majapahit. The government moved to Demak as Islam was introduced, brought by the Wali Songo. The government was then under the reign of Duke Ronggo Tohjiwo. In the time of the collapse, according to folklore, legendary heroes appeared against Raden Panji Pulongjiwo. He was caught by Mataram soldiers in the village now called Kepanjen Panggungrejo (Kepanji's). The destruction of the town was known as Malang Kutho Bedhah.

In the era of the Dutch East India Company, Malang was a base for the Trunojoyo resistance (1674-1680) against the Company-assisted Mataram. In the early nineteenth century, the government was headed by the Governor-General. The first Malang Regent was Raden Tumenggung Notodiningrat. He was appointed by the Dutch government by resolution of the Governor-General on 9 May 1820.

Since 1984, Malang Regency Hall has had a traditional ceremony, dating from the time of the Kanjuruhan Kingdom, wherein attendees are encouraged to wear traditional costumes of Malang.

Administrative districts 
The Malang Regency is divided into thirty-three districts (kecamatan), listed below with their areas and their populations at the 2010 census and the 2020 census. The table also includes the locations of the districts administrative centres, the number of administrative villages (rural desa and urban kelurahan) and offshore islands in each district, and its post codes.

Notes: (a) the most southerly nine districts, all (except Dampit, Kalipare and Pagak Districts) having a coastline on the Indian Ocean, comprises 43% of the regency's area but has only 25% of its population. The next-listed 21 districts comprise the entirety of the urbanised Malang Valley, together with more rural districts to the east. The last-mentioned 3 districts, which all lie west of Batu city, are almost completely physically separated by Batu from the rest of Malang Regency.

Tourism

The southern sector of Malang Regency has 39 natural beaches, 5 of which are frequently visited. Access to the beaches is limited and can be difficult for large vehicles.

Balekambang Beach is 70 kilometres south of Malang City. The beach is 2 kilometers long with a Hindu Temple in Bali. Pantai Bajul Mati beach is a beach which is in between Balekambang Beach and Sendang Biru Beach. The name means "Dead Crocodile" due to a rock in the sea shaped like a crocodile. Batu Bengkung Beach is near Bajul Mati Beach and has a natural pool trap by the sand dunes.

Climate

Malang Regency has a tropical monsoon climate (Am) with moderate to little rainfall from June to September and heavy to very heavy rainfall from October to May. The following climate data is for the town of Kepanjen.

References

External links
 
 Official Government Website (in Indonesian)

Regencies of East Java